The Lammenhorn is a mountain of the Swiss Pennine Alps, overlooking Saas-Balen in the canton of Valais. It lies north of the Balfrin, within the valley of Saas.

References

External links
 Lammenhorn on Hikr

Mountains of the Alps
Alpine three-thousanders
Mountains of Switzerland
Mountains of Valais